James Pugliese (born Newark, New Jersey, 1952) is an American percussionist, drummer, composer and international recording artist on over 150 CDs of experimental, jazz and rock music.

His performing experience is diverse. As a freelance percussionist he is in much demand and has performed with The New York Philharmonic Horizon Series (guest artist), New York City Ballet and soloist or performer on numerous new music and jazz festivals in Europe, Japan and the USA

Jim grew up listening to and playing soul music and rhythm and blues. He went on to study percussion with Raymond Des Roches and by the age of eighteen he had recorded the music of Edgar Varese and Charles Wuorinen for Nonsuch Records. He continued performing and or recording new music with John Cage, Lukas Foss, Kent Nagano and Philip Glass. He spent twelve years as a member of Dean Drummond’s Newband and The Harry Partch Ensemble, studying and performing microtonal music. During this same period he developed an interest in Afro-Cuban music and studied drumming and rhythm with Master Drummer Pablo Landrum.

For the last thirty years, while living in the East Village of New York City, Jim has been improvising recording and touring with many of downtown's most prominent composer/improvisers including John Zorn, Marc Ribot, Zeena Parkins, Bobby Previte and Anthony Coleman. He has recorded on over 150 CD's of new music, jazz, rock and movie soundtracks.   On November 23, 1997 Avant released the first cd for his collaborative percussion trio Easside Percussion with Christine Bard and Michael Evans.

One of his latest projects "Phase III" is a continuation of his ongoing quest to combine his diverse performing experiences into a single new sound with its base in rhythm. The music skirts and shifts along the edges of free improvisation, deep groove and New Music. The music reflects Jim's vision to explore the powerful, enlightening and spiritual secrets of drumming and is inspired by his recent association and work with Nii Tettey Tetteh, master musician from Ghana, with Milford Graves, learning drumming and healing through the heartbeat and his study of the spiritual songs of the Mbira Dzavadzimu from Zimbabwe.

Jim's latest CD "Live @ Issue Project Room NYC" just won "Best New Release of 2008" in "All About Jazz NY". His other current projects include a collaborative band "IDR" with Marco Cappelli, exploring the relationship between Southern Italian Folk Music and Improvisation and his newest project “Big Easy”

Pugliese currently teaches composition and percussion at New York's Fiorello H. LaGuardia High School of Music & Art and Performing Arts.

Discography

With Anthony Coleman
Selfhaters (Tzadik, 1996)
The Abysmal Richness of the Infinite Proximity of the Same (Tzadik, 1998)
Pushy Blueness (Tzadik, 2006)
Lapidation (New World, 2007)

External links
Official website for Pugliese and Xcellar Records
[ Jim Pugliese on AllMusicGuide]

1952 births
Living people
American percussionists
Musicians from Newark, New Jersey